The 1873 Richmond (Yorkshire) by-election was held on 27 May 1873.  The byelection was held due to the Succession to a peerage of the incumbent MP of the Liberal Party, Lawrence Dundas.  It was won by his younger brother, the unopposed Liberal candidate John Dundas.

References

1873 in England
Richmondshire
Richmond, North Yorkshire
1873 elections in the United Kingdom
By-elections to the Parliament of the United Kingdom in North Yorkshire constituencies
Unopposed by-elections to the Parliament of the United Kingdom in English constituencies
19th century in Yorkshire